Haliplus africanus is a species of water beetle in the Haliplidae family. It was discovered by Charles Nicholas Aubé in 1838.

References

Haliplidae
Beetles described in 1838
Taxa named by Charles Nicholas Aubé